This is a list of the 7 observers to the European Parliament for Slovenia in the 1999 to 2004 session. They were appointed by the Slovenian Parliament as observers from 1 May 2003 until the accession of Slovenia to the EU on 1 May 2004.

List

Sources
(in Slovenian)

Slovenia
2003
Slovenia